Hedley Howard Mattingly (May 7, 1915 – March 3, 1998) was a British actor who appeared in many American films and television series.

Career 
Hedley Mattingly was born in London, England. He began his career as a stage actor before the outbreak of World War II, during which he served in the Royal Air Force. In the early 1950s he moved to Canada accompanied by his wife Barbara, appearing in several CBC television dramas, before moving again to California in the 1960s.

In the 1960s and 1970s, he guest-starred in the NBC television series Thriller (1962). He also appeared in The Alfred Hitchcock Hour, Perry Mason, Death Valley Days, Mannix, Night Gallery, Ironside, and Columbo. He was featured in Alexander Galt: The Stubborn Idealist (1962), King Rat (1965), and The Bermuda Triangle (1979). His last appearance was in the film Riot (1997), with Sugar Ray Leonard.

Mattingly's best-known role was as the recurring character of Officer Hedley in the CBS series,  Daktari (1966–1969) starring Marshall Thompson in the title role.

Death
Mattingly died of cancer at Encino, California, in March 1998 and was buried at Forest Lawn Memorial Park.

Filmography 
1958: Folio -TV - Sgt. Deems
1959: Hudson's Bay -TV - Factor Balfour / The Captain / Clifton
1962: Thriller -TV - Canadian Man
1962: Five Weeks in a Balloon - Butler (uncredited)
1962: Alexander Galt: The Stubborn Idealist - Gov. Gen. Sir Edmund Head
1963: The Thrill of It All - Sidney - Chauffeur
1963: The Travels of Jaimie McPheeters -TV - Henry T. Coe
1964: Signpost to Murder - Police Constable Mort Rogers
1964: The Man from UNCLE (The Shark Affair) -TV - Mr. Wye / Captain Fowler
1964: Death Valley Days -TV (as an historical figure Joseph Harris Ridges (1827–1914) in episode "An Organ for Brother Brigham") - Joseph Ridges / Victor de Kiraly / Eadneard Muybridge
1965: Strange Bedfellows - Bagshott
1965: Marriage on the Rocks (1965) - Mr. Smythe (uncredited)
1965: King Rat - Dr. Prudhomme
1965: Westinghouse Desilu Playhouse -TV - Bartender
1966: Torn Curtain - Airline Official (uncredited)
1966: Daktari -TV - District Officer Hedley
1969: Mannix -TV - Dustin Rhodes
1970: Get Smart -TV
1971: Columbo -TV - Customs Man
1973: Lost Horizon - Col. Rawley
1973: Cleopatra Jones - Mattingly
1977: Lucan -TV - President Davies
1978: Hawaii Five-O -TV - Episode: The Meighan Conspiracy - Doheni
1979: The Bermuda Triangle - (uncredited)
1981: Goliath Awaits -TV - Bailey
1984: All of Me - Grayson
1984: Dynasty -TV - Vicar / Mr. Jensen
1996: Riot - Butler (final film role)

References 

Gianakos, Larry James Television drama series programming: a comprehensive chronicle, 1982–1984

External links

1915 births
1998 deaths
British expatriate male actors in the United States
Male actors from London
English male film actors
English male television actors
20th-century English male actors
Burials at Forest Lawn Memorial Park (Hollywood Hills)
Royal Air Force personnel of World War II
Deaths from cancer in California